Qualcomm's  (4G) is a suite of voice speech codecs used by CDMA networks that allows the network operators to dynamically prioritize voice quality to increase network capacity while maintaining voice quality.  Currently, the 4GV suite offers EVRC-B and EVRC-WB.

References

Speech codecs
Code division multiple access
Qualcomm